{{Infobox person
| name               = Nerea Alias
| image              = Nerea_Alias_2016.jpg
| birth_name         = Nerea Alias García
| birth_date         = 
| birth_place        = Anoeta, Spain
| nationality        = Spanish
| occupation         = Journalistactresstv presenter
| years_active       = 2003–present
| employer           = ETB 1ETB 2
| notable_works      = BetizuEgin kantu!
| television         = BetizuEgin kantu!BalbemendiSut&BlaiKontraEuskal Herria ZuzeneanKantugiroDe lo bueno mejorGure kasaEsto no es normal| spouse             = Xabi Solano (2011-2019)
}}

Nerea Alias García (born 2 January 1984) is a Spanish journalist, actress and TV presenter.

She made her debut at the age of nineteen in Betizu on the ETB 1 channel, being one of several Betizu artists (a former Betizu Star).

 Early Life 
Nerea Alias was born in 1984, Anoeta, Gipuzkoa, Basque Country (Spain).

 Career 
Nerea Alias started on television in 2003 at the age of nineteen in Betizu on the ETB 1 channel, as the presenter of the program, being one of several Betizu artists (a former Betizu Star). As she herself has stated "I was 19 years old and Betizu was the beginning, beginning to learn about what is my profession today''".

She also worked as an actress in the television series Balbemendi. In 2006 she was the presenter the talent show TV show Egin Kantu! from 2006 to 2010.

Since 2008, she was in charge as presenter of the Sut&Blai program, where she stayed for four years. For two seasons she presented the Euskal Herria Zuzenean program on ETB 1 and then one of her last jobs was as a reporter on the Kantugiro program.

In 2006, she worked as a reporter on the program De lo bueno lo mejor. Between 2017 and 2019 she collaborated on the program Gure kasa and currently she presents the television program Esto no es normal on ETB 2 together with Igor Siguero.

Private life 
She married Xabi Solano, musician and singer of Esne Beltza (Basque music group), in 2011. They got divorced in 2019.

Filmography

TV program 

 Betizu, ETB 1
 Egin Kantu!, ETB 1
 Sut&Blai, ETB 1
 Kontra, ETB 1
 Euskal Herria Zuzenean, ETB 1
 Kantugiro, ETB 1
 De lo bueno mejor, ETB 2
 Gure kasa, ETB 1
 Esto no es normal, ETB 2

TV series 

 Balbemendi, 2006–2008, ETB 1
 Altsasu (TV series), 2020, ETB 1

See also 

 Betizu
 Betizu Taldea
 Egin kantu!
 Elene Arandia
 Zuriñe Hidalgo
 Jon Gomez

References

External links 

 

1984 births
Living people
21st-century Spanish journalists
People from Gipuzkoa
Spanish television actresses
Spanish women television presenters